Actrix nyssaecolella, the tupelo leaffolder moth, is a species of moth of the family Pyralidae described by Harrison Gray Dyar Jr. in 1904. It is found from Michigan and New York to Florida and west to Texas.

The wingspan is 15–18 mm. They have light gray forewings with a dark gray band and a dark gray hourglass-shaped marking. The hindwings are brownish gray with a pale fringe. Adults are on wing from April to July.

The larvae feed on Nyssa species.

References

Phycitinae
Moths of North America
Moths described in 1904